WUNH is a non-commercial college radio station at the University of New Hampshire, in Durham, New Hampshire. The station broadcasts alternative music, sports, and more to the community and surrounding area on 6000 watts.

History
The first radio broadcasts from campus were agricultural programs sponsored by the cooperative extension service. These were broadcast live over telephone lines to WHEB in Portsmouth, New Hampshire. In 1930, a radio station was constructed on the third floor of Thompson Hall, the main administrative building, and students from the Speech and Drama Department formed the Mike and Dial Club (WMDR), producing live dramatic plays and a variety of other shows. In 1952, a new transmitter allowed the campus to send radio signals through electrical lines on campus, and WMDR radio was born. In 1958, the station moved into the newly constructed Memorial Union Building and in 1961 successfully applied for an FM broadcasting license for WUNH. The station signed on as a 10 watt FM educational at 90.3 in 1963.

In 1972, WUNH began FM broadcasting at 1750V/1750H watts and changed its frequency to 91.3. In 1997 the station received classification as a type A radio station, and began broadcasting at 6000V/1400H watts, allowing a coverage area that spans from southeastern to central New Hampshire and extends as far north as Cumberland County in Maine and south to Essex County in Massachusetts. In 2004, the university installed a 300-watt digital transmitter for HD radio.

Awards
1970: New England Broadcast Award, 1st Place Election Coverage United Press International
1980: For excellence in presidential coverage
1997: College Station of the Year from The Gavin Report
2011: Student Organization of the Year from The University of New Hampshire
2018: Student Organization of the Year from The University of New Hampshire

Programming
Shows are run by UNH students and community members. General programming shows (mostly student shows) include a minimum of 60% new (released within the past 60 days) independently released music, with no music played from the Billboard Top 40. Specialty shows focus on a specific genre and do not need to follow the new music rule. Currently, there are shows dedicated to reggae, classical, jazz, polka, bluegrass, blues, Celtic, world, Hawaiian, folk, show tunes, electronica, and metal. WUNH also broadcasts a selection of UNH football, basketball, and hockey contests. Interviews of musicians and members amongst the UNH community are done regularly as well as frequent ticket giveaways with popular music venues. The station also hosts live bands on a consistent basis, allowing WUNH to become a part of the live music circuit in the seacoast. They also host Vinyl Week, a week each semester where nothing but Vinyl is played by all DJs.

Notable alumni

 Jack Edwards, sportscaster, formerly on Versus, and ESPN; now play-by-play announcer for Boston Bruins games on NESN

Executive board

2022 

 Lena Topouzoglou - General Manager (May 2022-May 2023)
 Kate Possi - Program Director (May 2022-May 2023)
 Douglas Jones - Business Manager (May 2022-May 2023)
 Lydia Tusler - Chief Announcer (May 2022-May 2023)
 Katie Clayton - Music Director (May 2022-May 2023)
 Lily Neher - Production Director (May 2022-May 2023)

2021 

 Samantha Coetzee - General Manager (May 2021-December 2021)
 Samuel Graff - Program Director (May 2021-May 2022), General Manager (December 2021-May 2022)
 Kate Possi - Business Manager (May 2021-May 2022)
 Lydia Tusler - Chief Announcer (May 2021-May 2022)
 Braeden Hale - Music Director (May 2021-May 2022)
 Lily Neher - Production Director (May 2021-May 2022)
 Lena Topouzoglou - Promotion Director (May 2021-May 2022)

2020 
 Samantha Coetzee – General Manager (May 2020-May 2021)
 Hayden Stinson – Program Director (May 2020-May 2021)
 Samuel Graff – Chief Announcer (May 2020-May 2021)
 Angelee Ganno – Business Manager (May 2020-May 2021)
 Braden Hale - Music Director (May 2020-May 2021)
 Kelsea Batchelder - Promotions Director (May 2020-May 2021)

2019
 Teddy McNulty – General Manager (May 2019-May 2020)
 Kelsea Batchelder – Business Manager (May 2019-May 2020)

References

External links
Official website
Topo map: location of transmitter

WUNH Sports official website

UNH
UNH
University of New Hampshire
Radio stations established in 1963
1963 establishments in New Hampshire